Tada or TADA may refer to:

Places
 Tada, Nellore district, a village in Andhra Pradesh, India
 Tada mandal, in Nellore, Andhra Pradesh, India
 Tada Shrine, in Kawanishi, Hyōgo, Japan
 Tada Station (disambiguation)
Tada, a Nupe town on the Niger River

Music Entertainment and Media
 "Ta Da", a song by American artist Lil' Mo
 Ta-Dah, an album by American band Scissor Sisters

Other uses
 Tada (name), Japanese surname and given name
 Taking and driving away
 Terrorist and Disruptive Activities (Prevention) Act, a repealed anti-terrorism law in India